John Thomas Hinds (1866–1938) was a gospel preacher, teacher and evangelist for the Churches of Christ.  From 1934 until his death in 1938 he was the editor of the Gospel Advocate.  A year before his death in 1937, he published his own commentary on the Book of Revelation.

John T. Hinds is buried in the Evergreen Cemetery, located in Fayetteville, Arkansas.

References

1866 births
1938 deaths
Christian writers about eschatology
Ministers of the Churches of Christ
Editors of Christian publications
American members of the Churches of Christ